André Gomes is the name of:

André Gomes, (André Filipe Tavares Gomes), Portuguese footballer
André Gomes (footballer, born 1975), (Luiz André Gomes), Brazilian footballer
André Gomes (footballer, born 1996), (André Gomes Alves), Brazilian footballer
André Gomes (footballer, born 2004), (André Nogueira Gomes), Portuguese footballer
André Gomes (footballer, born 2006), (André Filipe Machado Gomes), Portuguese footballer
André Gomes (handballer), (André Dias Lopes Gomes), Portuguese handball player